Symmetry is a monthly peer-reviewed open access scientific journal published by MDPI covering several aspects of theories and applications related to symmetry/asymmetry phenomena in the natural sciences. The journal was established in 2009 and the editor-in-chief is Sergei Odintsov (Catalan Institution for Research and Advanced Studies). The journal features occasional special issues on specific selected topics.

Abstracting and indexing
The journal is abstracted and indexed in:

According to the Journal Citation Reports, the journal has a 2021 impact factor of 2.940.

Awards
Since 2018, the journal confers a "young investigator award" in recognition of excellence in the fields of symmetry phenomena in the natural sciences. The award consists of 2000 CHF, an offer to publish a paper free of charge following peer review, and an engraved plaque. The journal  also confers various other awards, typically on a yearly basis, and chooses a small number of articles judged to be of particular interest or importance to the field, which are selected as "Editor's Choice".

References

External links

Multidisciplinary scientific journals
Creative Commons Attribution-licensed journals
MDPI academic journals
Monthly journals
English-language journals
Publications established in 2009